Corbus is a surname. Notable people with the surname include:

Bill Corbus (1911–1998), American football player
John Corbus (1907–1966), United States submarine commander